Andrew Kuka (9 May 1951 – 24 June 2017) was an Australian rules footballer who played for the Fitzroy Football Club in the Victorian Football League (VFL).

Notes

External links 
		

2017 deaths
1951 births
Australian rules footballers from Victoria (Australia)
Fitzroy Football Club players